Līga Velvere (born 10 February 1990) is a Latvian athlete competing in the 800 metres and 400 metres hurdles. She competed at the 2016 IAAF World Indoor Championships without qualifying for the final.

Career
Līga Velvere is known for her success in the 800m race. She represented Latvia at the 2014 European Championship and has since made a name for herself on the international stage.

In February 2016, L. Velvere broke the long-standing Latvian record in the 800m indoor race, previously held by Marika Arent since 1985, with a time of 2:03.08. This was said to be a significant achievement.

L. Velvere continued to improve her personal best over the years, setting new records at various competitions. At the 2016 European Championships in Amsterdam, she reached the semi-finals of the 400m hurdles race and placed 17th overall.

In February 2017, L. Velvere broke her own Latvian record in the 800m indoor race with a time of 2:02.18. She went on to beat this record again in February 2018, winning the IAAF World Tour indoor race series in Glasgow, Scotland, with a time of 2:02.01.

L. Velvere's performances led her to the 2018 World Indoor Championships, where she placed 10th in the 800m race with a time of 2:02.98. In July 2018, she set a new personal record of 2:01.21 at a competition in Kortrijk, Belgium, which was the third fastest run in the history of Latvian athletics.

L. Velvere continued to improve her personal best in the 800m race, setting a new record of 2:00.85 in Karlstad, Sweden, in July 2018, and further improving it to 2:00.75 in Rovereto, Italy, in August of the same year.

On February 12, 2019, L. Velvere set a new Latvian record in the 800m indoor race with a time of 2:01.10 after winning a competition in France. She went on to compete at the 2019 World Championship in Doha, where she reached the semi-finals and placed 23rd overall.

However, L. Velvere's hopes of competing at the 2020 Summer Olympic Games in Tokyo were dashed due to an injury, and she was unable to finish the distance in her 800m discipline preliminaries.

Competition record

1Disqualified in the semifinals

Personal bests
Outdoor
800 metres – 2:02.79 (Portland 2015)
400 metres hurdles – 56.77 (Ventspils 2015)
Indoor
800 metres – 2:02.01 (Glasgow 2018)

References

External links
 

1990 births
Living people
Latvian female middle-distance runners
Latvian female hurdlers
Place of birth missing (living people)
Athletes (track and field) at the 2020 Summer Olympics
Olympic athletes of Latvia
European Games competitors for Latvia
Athletes (track and field) at the 2019 European Games